Munde may refer to:
 Munde (surname) (includes a list of people with the name)
 Mundé people, or Aikanã, an ethnic group of Brazil
 Mundé language, or Aikanã, a language of Brazil
 Saint Munde (died c. 962), Scottish abbot in Argyll, Scotland

See also 
 
 Monde (disambiguation)
 Munday (disambiguation)